Basketball at the 2018 Summer Youth Olympics was held from 7 to 17 October. The events took place at the Parque Mujeres Argentinas in Buenos Aires, Argentina. As in previous Youth Olympic games, the 3x3 format is used along with the skill challenge.

Qualification
Each National Olympic Committee (NOC) can enter a maximum of 2 teams, 1 team of 4 athletes per each gender. As hosts, Argentina was given 2 teams, 1 per each gender. The winner of the Men’s and Women’s 2017 U18 3x3 World Cup qualified to the Youth Olympics. Afterwards, the top 8 unqualified teams from each gender in the FIBA U18 3x3 National Federation Rankings (updated on 1 April 2018) qualified to the Youth Olympics. The remaining 10 teams qualified through the national rankings with the following restrictions; no more than 10 nations from the same continent can participate in one tournament and a minimum of 30 NOCs must participate across all events.

To be eligible to participate at the Youth Olympics athletes must have been born between 1 January 2000 and 31 December 2002. Furthermore, all team members must have participated in two FIBA sanctioned 3x3 events between 31 July 2017 and 31 July 2018 and all national federations must have organized at least three FIBA endorsed events between 1 April 2017 and 1 April 2018.

The teams were officially confirmed on April 5, 2018.

Qualification summary

* Replaced Japan

Format
The boys' and girls' tournaments have the same format. Twenty teams are divided into four pools of five teams. Each team plays every other team in the same pool. The top two ranked teams in each pool proceed to the knockout stage and the losers are eliminated.

Medal summary

Medal table

Events

References

External links

Official Results Book – Basketball 3x3

 
Basketball
2018 in 3x3 basketball
2018
International basketball competitions hosted by Argentina